Dmitriy Tikhomirov (born 21 April 1999) is a Belarusian professional footballer who plays for Orsha.

References

External links 
 
 
 Profile at FC Minsk website

1999 births
Living people
Belarusian footballers
Association football forwards
FC Minsk players
FC Naftan Novopolotsk players
FC Volna Pinsk players
FC Orsha players